The Ministry of Ports, Shipping and Waterways is the Indian ministry responsible for formulation and administration of the rules, regulations and laws relating to ports, shipping and waterways. The minister is Sarbananda Sonowal.

History 
In 1999, the Ministry of Surface Transport was re-organized into two departments, namely the Department of Shipping and the Department of Road Transport and Highways.

In 2000, the Ministry of Surface Transport was bifurcated into two Ministries namely the Ministry of Surface Transport and Highways and the Ministry of Shipping.

In 2004, The Ministry of Shipping and Ministry of Road Transport were again merged and renamed as Ministry of Shipping, Road Transport and Highways. There are two Department viz. Department of Shipping and Department of Road Transport & Highways.

In 2009, The Ministry of Shipping was again formed by bifurcating the Ministry Of Shipping, Road Transport, and Highways

Further, in 2020 the Ministry of Shipping was renamed as Ministry of Ports, Shipping and Waterways.

Ministers

Ministers of State

See also
 Inland Waterways Authority of India
 Exclusive economic zone of India
 Fishing in India
 Outline of India

References

External links
 

 
Shipping
Shipping ministries